The 1959 La Flèche Wallonne was the 23rd edition of La Flèche Wallonne cycle race and was held on 25 April 1959. The race started in Charleroi and finished in Liège. The race was won by Jos Hoevenaers.

General classification

References

1959 in road cycling
1959
1959 in Belgian sport
April 1959 sports events in Europe